The 2020–21 F.C. Copenhagen season is the club's 29th season in existence and the 29th consecutive season in the top flight of Danish football. In addition to the domestic league, Copenhagen will participate in this season's editions of the Danish Cup, the 2020 Danish Super Cup, and the UEFA Europa League. The season covers the period from August 2020 to 30 June 2021.

Players

Current squad

Out on loan

Non-competitive

Pre-season

Mid-season

Competitions

Overview

Competition record

Superliga

Regular season

Results by round - Regular season

Championship round

Results by round - Championship round

Regular season

Championship round

Danish Cup

UEFA Europa League

Statistics

Appearances 

This includes all competitive matches and refers to all squad members playing throughout the season, regardless of their current roster status.

Goalscorers 

This includes all competitive matches.

Assists 

This includes all competitive matches.

Clean sheets 

This includes all competitive matches.

Disciplinary record 

This includes all competitive matches.

References

External links

F.C. Copenhagen seasons
Copenhagen
Copenhagen